John William Trytsman (born 29 July 1971) is a South African former rugby union player.

Playing career
Trytsman matriculated at Durbanville High School and studied at the University of Stellenbosch, representing the Maties on the rugby field. In 1998, he returned to Western Province and later that year was selected to tour with the Springboks to Britain and Ireland. Trytsman did not play in any test matches but played in four tour matches for the Springboks.

See also
List of South Africa national rugby union players – Springbok no. 680

References

1971 births
Living people
South African rugby union players
South Africa international rugby union players
Western Province (rugby union) players
Boland Cavaliers players
Stellenbosch University alumni
Stormers players
Rugby union players from the Western Cape
Rugby union locks
Rugby union flankers